Phaeoacremonium is a fungus genus associated with wilt and decline diseases of woody hosts and human infections.

Togninia is the teleomorph (the sexual reproductive stage) of Phaeoacremonium.

Species 
 Phaeoacremonium aleophilum, associated with esca in mature grapevines and decline in young vines (Petri disease), two types of grapevine trunk disease.
 Phaeoacremonium alvesii, a cause of subcutaneous infection of humans 
 Phaeoacremonium amstelodamense, a cause of human joint infection
 Phaeoacremonium australiense, an endophyte of grapevines  
 Phaeoacremonium griseorubrum, a cause of human fungemia (blood infection)
 Phaeoacremonium krajdenii, a cause of subcutaneous infection of humans
 Phaeoacremonium parasitica, formerly Phialophora parasitica
 Phaeoacremonium scolyti, an endophyte of grapevine, also isolated from bark beetle larvae
 Phaeoacremonium sphinctrophorum, from fungal cyst of the human foot
 Phaeoacremonium subulatum, an endophyte of grapevine
 Phaeoacremonium tardicrescens, from unspecified human medical source
 Phaeoacremonium theobromatis, from stem of wild mountain cocoa (Theobroma gileri) in Ecuador
 Phaeoacremonium venezuelense, from eumycetoma of the human foot

References

External links 

Fungus genera